Stian Paulsen (born 3 July 1987) is a Norwegian racing driver.                                                                             Competing in the TCR Europe Touring Car Series. 

He previously raced in TCR International Series, European Touring Car Cup, SEAT León Eurocup and ADAC Volkswagen Polo Cup amongst others.

Racing career
Paulsen began his career in 2004 in karting. He switched to the ADAC Volkswagen Polo Cup for 2006, he stayed there for season 2007, taking four victories on his way to finishing third in the championship standings. In 2008 he switched to the Belgian Renault Clio Cup, winning the Junior Cup that year, as well as finishing third in the overall championship standings. He stayed in the series for another year, however only doing a half season, he took one win and finished eleventh in the standings. For 2010 he switched to the SEAT León Eurocup and ended the season thirteenth in the standings. In 2011 he moved to the German SEAT León Supercopa series, having done a single one-off in 2010. He took a single victory on his way to finishing ninth in the championship standings that year. For 2012 he entered the European Touring Car Cups Single-Makes Trophy which allowed him to continue to use his SEAT León Supercopa, he took five victories and never finished out of the top 2 in any of the eight races. He eventually won the championship title. In 2014 he returned to the SEAT León Eurocup, taking three wins and six podiums, he finished the season fifth in the championship standings. He continued in the series for 2015 and 2016, taking two victories and six podiums in 2015 as well as finishing second in the standings, while he took three victories and eight podiums in 2016 on his way to finishing third in the standings.

In March 2017 it was announced that he would race in the TCR International Series, driving a SEAT León TCR for his own team Stian Paulsen Racing.

He raced in TCR Europe in 2018 and 2019 both for his own team, with a best finish of 2nd in 2018 Hungarian round. 

In June 2022 after two years away from races he joined Comtoyou DHL Team Audi Sport for TCR Europe fourth round at Norisring in place of Tom Coronel.

Racing record

Complete TCR International Series results
(key) (Races in bold indicate pole position) (Races in italics indicate fastest lap)

Complete TCR Europe Touring Car Series results
(key) (Races in bold indicate pole position) (Races in italics indicate fastest lap)

† Driver did not finish, but was classified as he completed over 90% of the race distance.

References

External links
 
 

1987 births
Sportspeople from Fredrikstad
Living people
TCR International Series drivers
Norwegian racing drivers
SEAT León Eurocup drivers
European Touring Car Cup drivers
Comtoyou Racing drivers
TCR Europe Touring Car Series drivers